Epiphanocera is a genus of parasitic flies in the family Tachinidae.

Species
Epiphanocera costalis Townsend, 1915

Distribution
Peru.

References

Exoristinae
Tachinidae genera
Monotypic Brachycera genera
Taxa named by Charles Henry Tyler Townsend
Diptera of South America